Origami is a Canadian science fiction thriller film, directed by Patrick Demers and released in 2017. The film stars François Arnaud as David, a man struggling to make sense of whether his apparent ability to travel back and forth in time is the result of a psychotic break or a timeline that is genuinely folding in on itself.

The film's cast also includes Nobuya Shimamoto, Max Laferriere, Stefanie Nakamura, Benoît Gouin, Alexa-Jeanne Dubé, Normand D'Amour, Patrick Forest, Tania Kontoyanni and Milton Tanaka.

The film premiered on July 18, 2017 at the Fantasia Film Festival, before going into commercial release in 2018.

Critical response
Norman Wilner of Now rated the film three N's, writing that "the charismatic Arnaud (Blindspot, The People Garden) does a fine job of holding the whole thing together, even as when it briefly flirts with turning into a bad remake of The Butterfly Effect." André Duchesne of La Presse also praised Arnaud's performance as successfully carrying a difficult film.

Awards
At the Fantasia Film Festival, the film received a special citation from the Barry Convex Award jury.

Screenwriters André Gulluni and Claude Lalonde received a Prix Iris nomination for Best Screenplay at the 21st Quebec Cinema Awards in 2019.

References

External links

2017 films
Canadian science fiction thriller films
Films shot in Montreal
Fiction about origami
Quebec films
2010s Canadian films